For computer log management, the Common Log Format, also known as the NCSA Common log format, (after NCSA HTTPd) is a standardized text file format used by web servers when generating server log files. Because the format is standardized, the files can be readily analyzed by a variety of web analysis programs, for example Webalizer and Analog.

Each line in a file stored in the Common Log Format has the following syntax:

host ident authuser date request status bytes

The format is extended by the Combined Log Format with referer and user-agent fields.

Example 
 127.0.0.1 user-identifier frank [10/Oct/2000:13:55:36 -0700] "GET /apache_pb.gif HTTP/1.0" 200 2326

A dash in a field indicates missing data.

  is the IP address of the client (remote host) which made the request to the server.
  is the RFC 1413 identity of the client. Usually "-".
  is the userid of the person requesting the document.  Usually "-" unless .htaccess has requested authentication.
  is the date, time, and time zone that the request was received, by default in strftime format .
  is the request line from the client. The method ,  the resource requested, and  the HTTP protocol.
  is the HTTP status code returned to the client. 2xx is a successful response, 3xx a redirection, 4xx a client error, and 5xx a server error.
  is the size of the object returned to the client, measured in bytes.

Usage
Log files are a standard tool for computer systems developers and administrators. They record the "what happened, when, by whom" of the system. This information can record faults and help their diagnosis. It can identify security breaches and other computer misuse. It can be used for auditing. It can be used for accounting purposes.

The information stored is only available for later analysis if it is stored in a form that can be analysed. This data can be structured in many ways for analysis. For example, storing it in a relational database would force the data into a query-able format. However, it would also make it more difficult to retrieve if the computer crashed, and logging would not be available unless the database was available. A plain text format minimises dependencies on other system processes, and assists logging at all phases of computer operation, including start-up and shut-down, where such processes might be unavailable.

See also 
Extended Log Format
Log management and intelligence
Web log analysis software
Web counter
Data logging
Syslog

References

External links 
 

 

 

Log file formats